Bink may refer to:

 Bink Video, a video format popular in many video games
 Bink (The Magicians of Xanth), a character of the Xanth series by Piers Anthony
 Bink (producer), a hip-hop producer